A Lot About Livin' (And a Little 'bout Love) is the third studio album by American country music artist Alan Jackson. It was released on October 6, 1992, and produced the singles, "Chattahoochee", "She's Got the Rhythm (And I Got the Blues)", "Tonight I Climbed the Wall", "(Who Says) You Can't Have It All", and "Mercury Blues". "Chattahoochee", and "She's Got the Rhythm (And I Got the Blues)" were both #1 hits on the Hot Country Songs charts, while the other three songs all reached Top 5. Additionally, "Tropical Depression" peaked at #75 based on unsolicited airplay.

Keith Stegall produced the entire album, working with Scott Hendricks on "Tonight I Climbed the Wall".

Commercial performance
A Lot About Livin' (And a Little 'bout Love)  peaked  at #13 on the U.S. Billboard 200 and #1 on the Top Country Albums, becoming Alan Jackson's first #1 country album. In January 1996, A Lot About Livin' (And a Little 'bout Love) was certified 6× Platinum by the RIAA.

Track listing

Personnel
Alan Jackson – lead vocals
Eddie Bayers – drums
Stuart Duncan – fiddle
Robbie Flint – acoustic slide guitar
Paul Franklin – pedal steel guitar
Rob Hajacos – fiddle
Roy Huskey Jr. – double bass
Brent Mason – electric guitar
Weldon Myrick  – pedal steel guitar
Hargus "Pig" Robbins – piano
Bruce Rutherford – backing vocals
Hank Singer – fiddle
Keith Stegall – acoustic guitar
Bruce Watkins – acoustic guitar
Glenn Worf – bass guitar

Charts

Weekly charts

Year-end charts

Certifications

Accolades
Academy of Country Music

Single Record of the Year, "Chattahoochee" 1993
Album of the Year, 1993

Country Music Association
Single of the Year, "Chattahoochee"  1993
Music Video of the Year, "Chattahoochee" 1993
Song of the Year, "Chattahoochee"  1994

References

1992 albums
Alan Jackson albums
Arista Records albums
Albums produced by Keith Stegall